This bibliography of Barack Obama is a list of written and published works, both books and films, about Barack Obama, the 44th president of the United States.

Scholarly books and articles

 Congressional Quarterly. Congress and the Nation: Volume 13: 2009-2012 (CQ Press, 2013) online, 1075 pp of highly detailed coverage of all major themes 
 Congressional Quarterly. Congress and the Nation: Volume 14: 2012-2016 (CQ Press, 2017) 

 Conley, Richard S., and Kevin Baron. "Obama’s ‘Hidden-Hand’ Presidency: Myth, Metaphor, or Misrepresentation?." White House Studies 13 (2015): 129-57.

 

 Gaman-Golutvina, Oxana. "Political elites in the USA under George W. Bush and Barack Obama: Structure and international politics." Historical Social Research/Historische Sozialforschung 43.4 (2018): 141-163. online
 Garrow, David, Rising Star: The Making of Barack Obama (May 2017)

 

 Maass, Matthias. The World Views of the Obama Era (Palgrave Macmillan, 2018).

 

 
 

 

White, John Kenneth (2009). Barack Obama's America: How New Conceptions of Race, Family, and Religion Ended the Reagan Era.  University of Michigan Press.  .

Autobiographies

Rhetoric 

 Baysha, Olga. "Synecdoche that kills: How Barack Obama and Vladimir Putin constructed different Ukraines for different ends." International Communication Gazette 80.3 (2018): 230-249.
 Belisle, Jordan, et al. "Feasibility of contextual behavioral speech analyses of US presidents: Inaugural addresses of Bill Clinton, George W. Bush, Barack Obama, and Donald Trump, 1993–2017." Journal of Contextual Behavioral Science 10 (2018): 14-18.
 Bostdorff, Denise M. "Obama, Trump, and reflections on the rhetoric of political change." Rhetoric & Public Affairs 20.4 (2017): 695-706. online
 Gleason, Timothy R., and Sara S. Hansen. "Image control: The visual rhetoric of President Obama." Howard Journal of Communications 28.1 (2017): 55-71. online
 Hill, Theon E. "Sanitizing the struggle: Barack Obama, Selma, and civil rights memory." Communication Quarterly 65.3 (2017): 354-376. online

 Holliday, N. "'My Presiden(t) and Firs(t) Lady Were Black': Style, Context, and Coronal Stop Deletion in the Speech of Barack and Michelle Obama." American Speech: A Quarterly of Linguistic Usage (2017) 92(4), 459-486, “My Presiden(t) and Firs(t) Lady Were Black”:
 Holliday, Nicole, Jason Bishop, and Grace Kuo. "Prosody and political style: The case of Barack Obama and the L+ H* Pitch accent." Proceedings of the 10th International Conference on Speech Prosody 2020. online

 Iversen, Stefan, and Henrik Skov Nielsen. "Invention as intervention in the rhetoric of Barack Obama." Storyworlds: A Journal of Narrative Studies 9.1-2 (2017): 121-142.
 Kurtz, Jeffrey B. "'To Have Your Experience Denied... it Hurts': Barack Obama, James Baldwin, and the Politics of Black Anger." Howard Journal of Communications 28.1 (2017): 93-106. 

 Perry, Samuel. "Barack Obama, civil mourning, and prudence in presidential rhetoric." Howard Journal of Communications 28.2 (2017): 160-173 online.
 St. Onge, Jeffrey. "Neoliberalism as common sense in Barack Obama’s health care rhetoric." Rhetoric Society Quarterly 47.4 (2017): 295-312. online
 Widiatmika, Putu Wahyu, I. Made Budiarsa, and I. Gde Sadia. "Rhetorical Schemes in Barack Obama’s Winning Speech." Humanis 24.4: 394-401. online

Editions of his speeches
 Dionne Jr, E. J., and Joy-Ann Reid, eds. We are the change we seek: The speeches of Barack Obama (Bloomsbury Publishing USA, 2017).

Films
Obama Anak Menteng
2016: Obama's America
I Want Your Money
Obama Mama
Phas Gaye Re Obama
Southside With You
Barry

References

Obama, Barack
Bibliographies of people
Books about Barack Obama
Barack Obama-related lists